The 1999 NFL season was the 80th regular season of the National Football League (NFL). The Cleveland Browns returned to the field for the first time since the 1995 season, while the Tennessee Oilers changed their name to "Tennessee Titans," with the league retiring the name "Oilers."

The return of the Browns increased the number of teams to 31, the first time the league had played with an odd number of teams since 1966. As per the league's agreement with the City of Cleveland, the Browns were placed in the AFC Central, increasing that division to six teams. This also required the NFL to give at least one team a bye each week; previously, barring extreme circumstances, a club never received a bye during the first two weeks or last seven weeks of the season. Under the new system, for ten weeks of the season (Week #1, Week #2 and Week #10 to Week #17), one team received a bye, and for seven weeks of the season (Week #3 to Week #9), three teams received a bye. This format would continue until the Houston Texans joined the NFL in 2002, returning the league to an even number of teams.

The start of the 1999 NFL season was pushed back one week and started the weekend after Labor Day, a change from the previous seasons: due to the Y2K concerns, the NFL did not want to hold the opening round of the playoffs on Saturday, January 1, 2000, and did not want teams traveling on that day.  This was also done to avoid competing against college football's New Years Day bowl games.

Week 17 games were held on January 2, 2000, and the opening round of the playoffs would be scheduled for January 8 and 9, with the bye week before the Super Bowl removed to accommodate the one-week adjustment. The start of the season after Labor Day would become a regular fixture for future seasons, beginning in 2001.

The final spot in the NFC playoffs came down to an exciting final day of the season. The Green Bay Packers and Carolina Panthers were both at 7–8, tied for the last spot in the playoffs with the Dallas Cowboys and tied in other tiebreakers. The Packers/Panthers tie would be broken by best net point differential in conference games. With both the Packers and Panthers playing at 1:00 p.m. Eastern on January 2, the two teams tried to outscore the other. The Packers beat the Arizona Cardinals 49–24, and the Panthers beat the New Orleans Saints 45–13, with the result that the Packers finished ahead of the Panthers by 11 points. Nevertheless, Dallas defeated the New York Giants later that night to claim the final playoff spot.

The St. Louis Rams, who had had losing records for each of the past nine seasons dating back to their first tenure in Los Angeles (and had finished in last place in their division the previous season), surprised the entire league by making a Super Bowl run, as seven point favorites, by defeating the Tennessee Titans 23–16 in Super Bowl XXXIV at the Georgia Dome.

Transactions

Retirements
On May 2, 1999, John Elway announced his retirement from pro football. He played his entire career with the Denver Broncos.
On July 27, 1999, Barry Sanders announced he was retiring from pro football. His retirement was made public by faxing a letter to the Wichita Eagle, his hometown newspaper.

Draft
The 1999 NFL Draft was held from April 17 to 18, 1999 at New York City's Theater at Madison Square Garden. With the first pick, the Cleveland Browns selected quarterback Tim Couch from the University of Kentucky.

Expansion Draft
Held on February 9, 1999, 150 players were left unprotected by their teams for the Browns to select in the 1999 NFL expansion draft. With the first overall pick, the Browns selected Center Jim Pyne from the Detroit Lions.

Referee changes
Jerry Markbreit retired prior to the 1999 season. He joined the NFL in 1976 as a line judge before being promoted to the referee in just his second year. To date, he is the only NFL referee to officiate four Super Bowl games: Super Bowl XVII, Super Bowl XXI, Super Bowl XXVI, and Super Bowl XXIX. Jeff Triplette was promoted to referee to replace Markbreit.

Major rule changes
Clipping became illegal around the line of scrimmage just as it was on the rest of the field.
A new instant replay system (different from the one used from 1986 to 1991) is adopted to aid officiating. The system mirrors a method used by the defunct USFL in 1985:
In each game, each team has two challenge flags that can be thrown to start an official review of the play in question. Each challenge will require the use of a team's timeout. If the challenge is successful, the timeout is restored.
Inside of two minutes of each half, and during all overtime periods, all reviews will be initiated by a Replay Assistant. The Replay Assistant has an unlimited number of reviews, regardless of how many timeouts each team has left. And no timeout will be charged for any review by the Replay Assistant.
All replay reviews will be conducted by the referee on a field-level monitor. A decision will be reversed only when there is indisputable visual evidence to overturn the call. The referee has 90 seconds to review the play.
The officials will be notified of a replay request or challenge via a specialized electronic pager with a vibrating alert. Each head coach would also have a red flag to use as a backup to get the attention of the officials to challenge a play.
The replay system will only cover the following situations:
Scoring plays
Pass complete/incomplete/intercepted
Runner/receiver out of bounds
Recovery of a loose ball in or out of bounds
Touching of a forward pass, either by an ineligible receiver or a defensive player
Quarterback pass or fumble
Illegal forward pass
Forward or backward pass
Runner ruled not down by contact
Forward progress in regard to a first down
Touching of a kick
Too many men on the field

The league also added the following then-minor rule change that became significant in the playoffs a few years later:
When a Team A player is holding the ball to pass it forward, any intentional forward movement of his hand starts a forward pass, even if the player loses possession of the ball as he is attempting to tuck it back toward his body. Also, if the player has tucked the ball into his body and then loses possession, it is a fumble.

This new interpretation of a forward pass would later be commonly known as the “Tuck Rule”, and was repealed in 2013.

1999 deaths

Pro Football Hall of Fame
 Walter Payton: Having retired as the NFL's All-Time Leading Rusher, Payton died on November 1, 1999 from a rare liver disease known as primary sclerosing cholangitis.

Regular season

Scheduling formula

Highlights of the 1999 season included:
Thanksgiving: Two games were played on Thursday, November 25, featuring Chicago at Detroit and Miami at Dallas, with Detroit and Dallas winning.

Tiebreakers
Miami was the third AFC Wild Card ahead of Kansas City based on better record against common opponents (6–1 to Chiefs’ 5–3).
N.Y. Jets finished ahead of New England in the AFC East based on better division record (4–4 to Patriots’ 2–6).
Seattle finished ahead of Kansas City in the AFC West based on head-to-head sweep (2–0).
San Diego finished ahead of Oakland in the AFC West based on better division record (5–3 to Raiders’ 3–5).
Dallas was the second NFC Wild Card based on better record against common opponents (4–2 to Lions’ 3–3), head-to-head victory over Green Bay, and better conference record than Carolina (7–5 to Panthers’ 6–6).
Detroit was the third NFC Wild Card based on better conference record than Green Bay (7–5 to Packers’ 6–6) and head-to-head victory over Carolina.

Playoffs

Statistical leaders

Team

Individual

Awards

Coaching changes

Baltimore Ravens – Brian Billick; replaced Ted Marchibroda who was fired after the 1998 season.
Carolina Panthers – George Seifert; replaced Dom Capers who was fired after the 1998 season.
Chicago Bears – Dick Jauron; replaced Dave Wannstedt who was fired after the 1998 season.
Cleveland Browns – Chris Palmer; hired before the season, first coach of revived Browns.
Green Bay Packers – Ray Rhodes; replaced Mike Holmgren who resigned to become Head Coach and General Manager of the Seattle Seahawks.
Kansas City Chiefs – Gunther Cunningham; replaced Marty Schottenheimer who resigned at the end of the 1998 season.
Philadelphia Eagles – Andy Reid; replaced Ray Rhodes who was fired after the 1998 season.
San Diego Chargers – Mike Riley; replaced interim head coach June Jones who replaced Kevin Gilbride during the 1998 season.
Seattle Seahawks – Mike Holmgren; replaced Dennis Erickson who was fired after the 1998 season.

Stadium changes
 Baltimore Ravens: Ravens Stadium at Camden Yards was renamed PSINet Stadium after the internet service provider PSINet acquired the naming rights
 Cleveland Browns: The reactivated Browns team moves into Cleveland Browns Stadium
 Tennessee Titans: The renamed Titans moved from Vanderbilt Stadium to Adelphia Coliseum, with the Adelphia Communications Corporation acquiring the naming rights
 Washington Redskins: Jack Kent Cooke Stadium was renamed FedExField after FedEx acquired the naming rights

New uniforms
 The Baltimore Ravens were forced to scrap their original helmet logo, a shield with raven wings displaying a letter "B", because of a trademark dispute. Their new helmet logo featured a purple raven's head with the letter "B" superimposed. The team introduced a new secondary shield logo with alternating Calvert and Crossland emblems similar to the flag of Maryland.
 The reactivated Cleveland Browns restored the team's classic design, but widened the pants stripes.
 The Detroit Lions returned to wearing silver instead of blue pants with their white jerseys. TV numbers moved from the sleeves to the shoulders.
 The Philadelphia Eagles added black stripping on the sleeve ends on the green jerseys.
 The renamed Tennessee Titans unveiled new uniforms featuring navy and white jerseys, white helmets, and red trim. White pants were worn with the navy jerseys and navy pants with the white jerseys. The new helmet logo featured a circle with a letter "T" and three stars in a pattern matching those on the Tennessee state flag with a trail of flames. 
 The New Orleans Saints switched from gold to black numbers on their white jerseys. They also began wearing black pants with a wide gold stripe with their white jerseys.

Television
This was the second year under the league's eight-year broadcast contracts with ABC, CBS, Fox, and ESPN to televise Monday Night Football, the AFC package, the NFC package, and Sunday Night Football, respectively.

Dan Dierdorf left ABC to return to CBS, joining Verne Lundquist on the latter network's #2 crew. Dierdorf replaced Randy Cross, who then became part of an overhauled talent lineup on The NFL Today: Jim Nantz remained as host, but Marcus Allen, Brent Jones, and George Seifert were replaced by Cross, Craig James, and Jerry Glanville. ABC decided to leave Al Michaels and Boomer Esiason in a two-man booth. ABC also dropped Frank Gifford's segments from its MNF pregame show, letting Chris Berman to host the entire 20 minutes.

References

NFL Record and Fact Book
NFL History 1991–2000  (Last accessed October 17, 2005)
Total Football: The Official Encyclopedia of the National Football League
Steelers Fever – History of NFL Rules (Last accessed October 17, 2005)
NFL introduces Instant Replay technology (Last accessed November 4, 2005)
Tuck Rule Hard to Grasp by Mark Maske, The Washington Post, October 15, 2005 (Last accessed November 4, 2005)

External links
Football Outsiders 1999 DVOA Ratings and Commentary

1999
 
National Football League